Batia is a moth genus of the superfamily Gelechioidea.

Species :
 Batia hilszczanskii
 Batia inexpectella
 Batia internella
 Batia lambdella
 Batia lunaris
 Batia samosella
 Batia unitella

References 

Oecophoridae